Verne Lyle Bowers (December 23, 1919 – March 12, 2020) was a United States Army major general who served as Adjutant General of the United States Army from 1971 to 1975.

Bowers joined the Army and served in World War II. He was for a time stationed in Panama which is where he met Arlene who he would later marry. He served in the Korean and Vietnam Wars as well. He earned a degree from Harvard Business School.

References

1919 births
2020 deaths
United States Army generals
United States Army personnel of World War II
United States Army personnel of the Korean War
United States Army personnel of the Vietnam War
Harvard Business School alumni
American expatriates in Panama
American centenarians
Men centenarians
Burials at Arlington National Cemetery